KELI (98.7 FM, "98.7 KISS FM") is a radio station that serves the San Angelo, Texas, area with a Top 40/CHR format. The station is owned by Townsquare Media. It is the local affiliate to The Kidd Kraddick Morning Show.

History
On December 31, 2010 KELI changed their format from adult hits (as "Bob FM") to adult contemporary, branded as "Magic 98.7".

On May 9, 2016 KELI flipped to Hot AC as "i98.7", adding Elvis Duran in mornings.

On July 2, 2018 KELI changed their format from hot AC to top 40/CHR, branded as "98.7 Kiss FM".

References

External links
KELI official website

ELI
Contemporary hit radio stations in the United States
Townsquare Media radio stations